Twin Cities refers to the Minneapolis–Saint Paul metropolitan area in the U.S. state of Minnesota.

Twin Cities may also refer to:

Concept 
 Twin cities, the general concept of neighboring cities

Places 
 Twin Cities, a nickname for the two cities, Minneapolis–Saint Paul
 Twin Cities Army Ammunition Plant

Organizations 
 Twin Cities Hardingfelelag, a musical group
 Twin Cities Financial, a bank
 Twin Cities Marathon, an annual running event
 Twin Cities PBS, a television station
 Twin Cities Phoenix, a defunct soccer team
 Twin Cities Pride

Railroad 
 Twin Cities Hiawatha
 Twin Cities and Western Railroad
 Twin Cities Zephyr
 Twin Cities 400

See also 
 Twin city (disambiguation)
 Sister city
 USS Minneapolis